Chahak (also Romanized as Chāhak) is a village in Hudian Rural District, in the Central District of Dalgan County, Sistan and Baluchestan Province, Iran. At the 2006 census, its population was 47, in 9 families.

References 

Populated places in Dalgan County